Shivalinga Sakshi (Kannada: ಶಿವಲಿಂಗ ಸಾಕ್ಷಿ) is a 1960 Indian Kannada film, directed by D. Shankar Singh and Chandra Mohan and was produced by D. Shankar Singh. The film stars Udaykumar, Prathima Devi and K. S. Ashwath in the lead roles. The film has musical score by P. Shyamanna.

Cast
Udaykumar
Prathima Devi
K. S. Ashwath

References

External links
 

1960 films
1960s Kannada-language films